Washington Guzmán Soto (29 September 1918 – 2 February 1985) was a Chilean swimmer. He competed in the men's 400 metre freestyle at the 1936 Summer Olympics.

References

External links
 

1918 births
1985 deaths
Olympic swimmers of Chile
Swimmers at the 1936 Summer Olympics
Chilean male freestyle swimmers
Sportspeople from Santiago
20th-century Chilean people